Mohammadpur Central University College is an undergraduate college in Dhaka, Bangladesh established in 1972. The college is basically a merger of three independent institutions — Dhanmondi Central College, Mohammadpur College and Mohammadpur Girls College. The founding committee to administer the institution was headed by Dr. Fazlul Halim Chowdhury, the longest-serving vice-chancellor of the University of Dhaka.

The college awards degrees having the National University of Bangladesh as parent institution. Teaching plans are open for its instructors to make on their own, but major examinations are held under syllabus, schedule and administration of the National University.

References

Educational institutions established in 1972
Universities and colleges in Dhaka
1972 establishments in Bangladesh